Alipašino polje (lit. "Ali Pasha's Field") is a neighbourhood in Sarajevo, Bosnia and Herzegovina, located in the Sarajevo municipality of Novi Grad.

It consists of three sub-neighborhoods: Faza A, Faza B, and Faza C, which include six local communities. They were named after the order in which they were built. The construction of Alipašino Polje was conducted between 1974 and 1979 in accordance with the 1964 general plan of development of Sarajevo. The lowest buildings have 4 floors and the highest ones have 18 floors. During the Bosnian War and the city's siege, many facades and apartments of the buildings in Alipašino Polje were damaged. The neighborhood has an estimated population of 18.662 in its six local communities (mjesne zajednice).

External links

Neighbourhoods in Grad Sarajevo
Novi Grad, Sarajevo